Peter Pokorný (born 8 August 2001) is a Slovak professional footballer who plays as a defensive midfielder for MOL Fehérvár in Nemzeti Bajnokság I, on loan Spanish club Real Sociedad, and the Slovak U21 team.

Club career
Pokorný started playing football with AS Trenčín, before moving to the academy of Red Bull Salzburg. In 2018 he signed with FC Liefering, the feeder team of FC Red Bull Salzburg.

Pokorný made his debut for Liefering on 3 August 2018, before being replaced by Nikola Stošić in the 63rd minute.

On the 16 June 2021, Pokorný signed a three year deal with Spanish side Real Sociedad, being placed initially into the B team under manager Xabi Alonso.

After one season, however, in July 2022, Pokorný departed to Hungarian Nemzeti Bajnokság I to feature for Fehérvár FC on a one-year loan deal.

International career
Pokorný was first recognised as an alternate broader squad member for the senior Slovak national team on 28 September 2021 ahead of two 2022 FIFA World Cup qualifiers against Russia and Croatia. Pokorný then first penetrated into the national team nomination in November 2022 by Francesco Calzona being listed as a part of a 27-man squad for two friendly fixtures against Montenegro and Marek Hamšík's retirement game against Chile. While he was available on the bench for both of the fixtures, he was not fielded in either of them. Subsequently, in December 2022, Pokorný was shortlisted in a nomination for senior national team prospective players' training camp at NTC Senec.

Personal life
Other than native Slovak, Pokorný also speaks English, German and Spanish.

Career statistics

Club

References

External links

2001 births
Living people
Sportspeople from Trenčín
Slovak footballers
Slovak expatriate footballers
Slovakia youth international footballers
Slovakia under-21 international footballers
Association football midfielders
FC Red Bull Salzburg players
FC Liefering players
SKN St. Pölten players
Real Sociedad B footballers
Fehérvár FC players
2. Liga (Austria) players
Austrian Football Bundesliga players
Segunda División players
Nemzeti Bajnokság I players
Expatriate footballers in Austria
Expatriate footballers in Spain
Expatriate footballers in Hungary
Slovak expatriate sportspeople in Austria
Slovak expatriate sportspeople in Spain
Slovak expatriate sportspeople in Hungary